Sevil Magsud gizi Hajiyeva (3 October 196812 September 2000) was an Azerbaijani singer and lead vocalist of the music groups  and .

Life and career
Sevil Hajiyeva was born on 3 October 1968 in Azerbaijan's capital Baku and graduated from the piano department of Baku Academy of Music (then called Azerbaijan State Conservatory).

In the late 1980s, she became one of the most prominent Azerbaijani singers. As a lead vocalist, she became primarily associated with the music group Karvan. There, she sang her hit song "Şahzadə" (Prince). After Karvan's breakup, she was invited to sing in the vocal quartet Qaya by the group's art manager . There she sang until the mid-1990s, after which she disappeared from the public eye and settled in the United States.

Death
On 12 September 2000, Hajiyeva died in Los Angeles from multiple gunshot wounds during an armed robbery. She was buried at Forest Lawn Memorial Park in Hollywood Hills, California.

References

1968 births
2000 deaths
People from Baku
20th-century Azerbaijani women singers
Azerbaijani women pop singers
Baku Academy of Music alumni
Deaths by firearm in California
Burials at Forest Lawn Memorial Park (Hollywood Hills)